Yungaba may refer to:
 Yungaba Immigration Centre in Brisbane, Queensland, Australia
 Yungaba Migrant Hostel in Rockhampton, Queensland, Australia